Scopula mustangensis is a moth of the family Geometridae. It is found in the Palaearctic region.

References

Moths described in 1995
mustangensis
Palearctic Lepidoptera